In cryptography, the Iraqi block cipher was a block cipher published in C source code form by anonymous FTP upload around July 1999, and widely distributed on Usenet. It is a five round unbalanced Feistel cipher operating on a 256 bit block with a 160 bit key.

The source code shows that the algorithm operates on blocks of 32 bytes (or 256 bits). That's four times larger than DES or 3DES (8 bytes) and twice as big as Twofish or AES (16 bytes).
It also shows that the key size can vary from 160 to 2048 bits.

A comment suggests that it is of Iraqi origin. However, like the S-1 block cipher, it is generally regarded as a hoax, although of lesser quality than S-1. Although the comment suggests that it is Iraqi in origin, all comments, variable and function names and printed strings are in English rather than Arabic; the code is fairly inefficient (including some pointless operations), and the cipher's security may be flawed (no proof).

Because it has a constant key schedule the cipher is vulnerable to a slide attack. However, it may take 264 chosen texts to create a single slid pair, which would make the attack unfeasible. It also has many fixed points, although that is not necessarily a problem, except possibly for hashing modes. No public attack is currently available. As with S-1, it was David Wagner who first spotted the security flaws.

References

External links
 Source code for the cipher
 File encryption with IBC in ECB and CBC Mode
 Source code of the Iraqi block cipher ECB Mode
  Source code for Microsoft Visual C++ 5.0 ECB Mode
 Compiled code (Console Application) ECB Mode
 Source code of the Iraqi block cipher CBC Mode
 Source code for Microsoft Visual C++ 5.0 CBC Mode
 Compiled code (Console Application) CBC Mode

Block ciphers
Internet hoaxes
1999 hoaxes